The Imperial Order of the Lion and the Sun (Persian: نشان سلطنتی شیر و خورشید) was instituted by Fat’h Ali Shah of the Qajar dynasty in 1808 to honour foreign officials (later extended to Iranians) who had rendered distinguished services to Iran. In 1925, under the Pahlavi dynasty the Order continued as the Order of Homayoun with new insignia, though based on the Lion and Sun motif. This motif was used for centuries by the rulers of Iran, being formally adopted under Mohammad Shah.

The order is abbreviated as KLS, for Knight of Lion and Sun.

The order was senior to the Order of the Crown. It was issued in five grades.

In literature
 Anton Chekhov has a short story titled The Lion And The Sun. The story is about a mayor who had "long been desirous of receiving the Persian order of The Lion and the Sun".

Notable Recipients

See also

 Lion and Sun
 Order of Aftab
 Order of the Red Lion and the Sun
 Neshan-e Aqdas
 Order of Zolfaghar

References

Sources

External links

Qajar Orders and Decorations
Orders & Decorations of Pahlavi dynasty are exhibited in the ORDER section of the website

Civil awards and decorations of Iran
Awards established in 1808
Qajar Iran